Ali Fayad (born May 12, 1999) is a Lebanese-American football linebacker for the Philadelphia Stars of the United States Football League (USFL). He was most recently a member of the Toronto Argonauts of the Canadian Football League (CFL).

Early life and education
Fayad was born on May 12, 1999, in Dearborn, Michigan. He is Lebanese. Fayad attended Dearborn High School, where as a senior he made 60 tackles and 17 sacks, earning Detroit Free Press first-team all-state and Detroit News all-metro honors.

Fayad initially committed to Eastern Michigan, but changed his mind and instead committed to Western Michigan in 2017. As a true freshman, Fayad appeared in every game and started three, making 20 tackles, 2-and-a-half quarterback sacks and one fumble recovered.

In 2018, Fayad appeared in 13 games and was a starter in the final 12. He made a total of 34 tackles and 7.5 sacks, while also recording four forced fumbles and a recovery. He also recorded 12 tackles-for-loss, leading the school. Fayad started every game in 2019 and made a total of 53 tackles, 6.5 sacks, four forced fumbles and a recovery, earning second-team all-conference honors. Prior to the 2020 season, Fayad was ranked the number ten edge defender in the nation.

In a COVID-19-shortened 2020 season, Fayad played in four games and made 17 tackles and four sacks. After a game against Toledo, he was named to the Pro Football Focus Team of the Week.

In 2021, Fayad ranked fourth in FBS with 13 sacks and was named the Mid-American Conference Defensive Player of the Year.

Professional career

Philadelphia Eagles
After going unselected in the 2022 NFL Draft, Fayad was signed by the Philadelphia Eagles as an undrafted free agent. He was released on August 14, 2022.

Toronto Argonauts
On September 3, 2022, Fayad was signed to the practice roster of the Toronto Argonauts in the Canadian Football League (CFL). He played in four games for the Argos in 2022, contributing with four defensive tackles, one special teams tackle, and one sack. Fayad won the 109th Grey Cup to conclude the season. He was released by the Argos on February 28, 2023.

Philadelphia Stars
On March 4, 2023, Fayad signed with the Philadelphia Stars of the United States Football League (USFL).

References

External links
 Western Michigan Broncos bio

1999 births
Living people
Lebanese players of American football
American football defensive linemen
Players of American football from Michigan
Sportspeople from Dearborn, Michigan
Western Michigan Broncos football players
Philadelphia Eagles players
Philadelphia Stars (2022) players